Funiculus (Latin for "slender rope") is any cord-like structure in anatomy or biology, and may refer to:

 in the peripheral nervous system a bundle of axons that may be bundled into a nerve fascicle
 in the central nervous system one of the paired white matter regions of the spinal cord: the anterior funiculus, the lateral funiculus, and the posterior funiculus; and in the fourth ventricle the funiculus separans a strip of ependyma.
 the umbilical cord attaching a fetus to the placenta during pregnancy
 the spermatic cord formed by the vas deferens and surrounding tissue
 in insect antennae, the funicle is the segment connecting the club with the base
 in flowering plants, the funiculus is the stalk that attaches an ovule to the placenta 
 in mycology, the funicular cord is a sticky trailing thread that attaches the peridioles (the "eggs") to the peridium (the "nest") in some species of bird's nest fungi